Edmond Thibaudeau, also known as L'Orignal à Thibaudeau, was a local politician in Shawinigan, Quebec.  He was the fifth Mayor of Shawinigan, Quebec from 1915 to 1917.

He was born in 1872 in Saint-Grégoire, Centre-du-Québec and has Acadian ancestry.

In the early 1900s, Thibaudeau operated a small private power plant on the Petite Rivière Shawinigan and was therefore competing with the Shawinigan, Water & Power Company for the local distribution of electricity.

Thibaudeau is most remembered for his flamboyant personality.  He earned his nickname, L'Orignal à Thibaudeau (Thibaudeau the Moose), after he regularly rode through the streets of Shawinigan on a moose-drawn carriage.

Thibaudeau was a City Councillor from 1904 to 1909 and from 1913 to 1915. He successfully ran for Mayor in 1915 against incumbent Joseph-Auguste Frigon.

Under his tenure the first streets (Second, Third, Fourth and Fifth streets) were paved.

Thibaudeau was defeated by Joseph-Auguste Frigon in 1917.

He died in 1957.

Footnotes

See also
Mayors of Shawinigan
Mauricie
Shawinigan, Quebec
Shawinigan, Water & Power Company

1872 births
1957 deaths
Acadian people
Mayors of Shawinigan
People from Centre-du-Québec